Jackass Investing: Don't do it. Profit from it. is a book written by Michael Dever published by Ignite LLC in 2011. Dever is the founder and CEO of Brandywine Asset Management, Inc., an investment management firm founded in 1982.

The book has also been released under the title Exploiting the Myths: Profiting from Wall Street's misguided beliefs.

Overview
"Jackass Investing" is a best-selling investment book that challenges conventional investment wisdom and presents an entirely new system of thought.  The book describes 20 common investment myths and explains why each is a myth and not a fact.

The book is based on the trading philosophy of author Michael Dever.  Dever's trading philosophy is based on broad strategy and market diversification.

According to Dever, the definition of "Jackass Investing" is taking unnecessary risk.

The book was published in 2011, but Dever initially developed the idea for the book in 1999.  He decided to write "Jackass Investing" to systematically refute major investment myths by presenting the truth.  He believes that most investment professionals preach similar "myths" that prohibit investors from creating truly diversified portfolios.

Dever introduces the concept of "return drivers" and explains how to use them to create trading strategies, which are the components necessary to create a truly diversified portfolio.  A return driver is the core underlying reason that drives the price of a market.

The Myths
The "myths" include the following:
Myth #1:  Stocks Provide an Intrinsic Return
Myth #2:  Buy and Hold Works Well for Long Term Investors
Myth #3:  You Can't Time the Market
Myth #4:  "Passive" Investing Beats "Active" Investing
Myth #5:  Stay Invested So You Don't Miss the Best Days
Myth #6:  Buy Low, Sell High
Myth #7:  It's Bad to Chase Performance
Myth #8:  Trading is Gambling - Investing is Safer
Myth #9:  Risk Can Be Measured Statistically
Myth #10: Short Selling is Destabilizing and Risky
Myth #11: Commodity Trading is Risky
Myth #12: Futures Trading is Risky
Myth #13: It's Best to Follow Expert Advice
Myth #14: Government Regulations Protect Investors
Myth #15: The Largest Investors Hold All the Cards
Myth #16: Allocate a Small Amount to Foreign Stocks
Myth #17: Lower Risk by Diversifying Across Asset Classes
Myth #18: Diversification Failed in the '08 Financial Crisis
Myth #19: Too Much Diversification Lowers Returns
Myth #20: There is No Free Lunch

References

External links
Jackass Investing - Official Website
Brandywine Asset Management, Inc.
Movies To Go, Inc
Mike Dever on Twitter
"Mike Dever of Brandywine: The Interview" | Michael Covel | The Trend Following Manifesto | February 14, 2012
The Wall Street Journal This Weekend | May 5, 2012
"Dever: Experts Are No Better at Managing Money" | Bloomberg TV | May 31, 2012
"Mike Dever on the Podcast for a Return Visit: New and Extended" | Michael Covel | The Trend Following Manifesto | July 3, 2012
Mike Dever on "Money Matters" | July 23, 2012
"Breaking Down Investing Myths" | Bloomberg TV | July 24, 2012

2011 non-fiction books
Books about traders
Business books
Finance books